Bernardo Attolico (17 January 1880, Canneto di Bari – 9 February 1942, Rome) was an Italian diplomat.

In 1915 he was appointed to represent the Italian Ministry of Agriculture, Industry and Commerce at the Commission Internationale de Ravitaillement in London. Then in 1916 he represented Italy in the Wheat Executive, and later the War Purchases and Finance Council, and the executive Committee of the Allied Maritime Transport Council and the Food Council Executive. In 1919 he participated in the peace negotiations in Paris. He served as the High Commissioner of the League of Nations at Danzig (1920-1921), Italian ambassador to Brazil (1928–1930), to the Soviet Union (1930–1935), to Nazi Germany (1935–1940) as well as ambassador to the Holy See in Rome (1940–1942).

References

External links
 
 Photos of Bernardo Attolico in Immaginario Diplomatico - collection of historical photos of Italian Diplomats by Stefano Baldi 

1880 births
1942 deaths
Ambassadors of Italy to Brazil
Ambassadors of Italy to the Soviet Union
Ambassadors of Italy to Germany
Italian diplomats
20th-century diplomats